Irilone is an isoflavone, a type of flavonoid. It can be found in Trifolium pratense (red clover), in Iris unguicularis and in Iris germanica.

References 

Isoflavones